There are nearly 120 current and former places of worship in the district of East Hampshire in the English county of Hampshire.  A range of Christian denominations own and operate 87 churches, chapels and meeting halls across the district, and a further 32 buildings no longer serve a religious function but survive in alternative uses.  East Hampshire is one of 13 local government districts in Hampshire, a large, mostly rural county southwest of London.  The district is predominantly rural, with dozens of villages and hamlets; the small market towns of Alton and Petersfield are the main centres of population.  Both towns and many of the villages have ancient Church of England parish churches; others were rebuilt or founded anew in the 19th century during a rush of Victorian-era church-building; and other denominations established chapels throughout the district from the late 18th century.

The 2011 United Kingdom census found that the majority of the district's population was Christian, and there are no places of worship in the area for followers of other faiths. The Church of England—the country's Established Church—has the largest stock of church buildings, but many other denominations and groups are represented.  There are several Roman Catholic churches, and the major Nonconformist denominations such as Methodists, Baptists and the United Reformed Church are represented by chapels in the main towns and various villages.  Less mainstream groups worship in the district as well, such as the International Presbyterian Church, Plymouth Brethren Christian Church and the spiritualist organisation The White Eagle Lodge—whose headquarters and main temple, "like an Art Deco version of the Pantheon", is in the village of Liss.

Historic England or its predecessor English Heritage have awarded listed status to 48 current and eight former places of worship in East Hampshire.  A building is defined as "listed" when it is placed on a statutory register of buildings of "special architectural or historic interest" in accordance with the Planning (Listed Buildings and Conservation Areas) Act 1990. The Department for Digital, Culture, Media and Sport, a Government department, is responsible for this; Historic England, a non-departmental public body, acts as an agency of the department to administer the process and advise the department on relevant issues. There are three grades of listing status. Grade I, the highest, is defined as being of "exceptional interest"; Grade II* is used for "particularly important buildings of more than special interest"; and Grade II, the lowest, is used for buildings of "special interest".

Overview of the district and its places of worship

Clockwise from the south, it shares borders with the borough of Havant, the City of Winchester district, the borough of Basingstoke and Deane and the district of Hart, all in Hampshire; the Surrey district of Waverley; and the West Sussex district of Chichester. The ancient market towns of Petersfield and Alton and the military town of Bordon (with neighbouring Whitehill) are the largest settlements, followed by the villages of  Four Marks, Horndean, Liphook and Liss.

Many of East Hampshire's Anglican churches have ancient origins, even where little or no original fabric survives.  The oldest to be documented are Selborne and Idsworth, first mentioned in 1049 and 1053 respectively—although some parts of Idsworth church were built in the 10th century.  East Meon was founded in 1080 and was complete in its present form by 1150.  Alton's original parish church, St Lawrence, was also founded in the late 11th century, and part of its tower survives from that time.  Work on the churches at Priors Dean, Petersfield and Bentley started in the 1120s, and the oldest parts of Binsted and West Tisted are also early 12th-century.  Upper Wield dates from the middle of that century, and Bentworth, Buriton, Catherington, Farringdon, Hartley Mauditt, Holybourne, Medstead and Steep also retain some 12th-century fabric.  Several other churches have 13th-century origins: Bramshott, Chalton, East Worldham, Empshott, Newton Valence, Upper Froyle and West Worldham.  The substantially rebuilt church at East Tisted retains some 14th-century work in the tower, but the contemporary church at Headley burnt down in 1836 and was rebuilt in the 1850s.  A fire in 2014 also destroyed much of the medieval work at Ropley, where the nave dates from the 11th century.

The Victorian era brought about an increase in the pace of church restoration work and the building of new churches.  In East Hampshire, some of Britain's most prominent Victorian church architects were involved.  Arthur Blomfield was especially prolific, restoring the churches at Newton Valence (1871–72), Petersfield (1873–74) and Buriton (1877–78), rebuilding Chawton after a fire in 1871, extending High Cross (1893) and building new churches at Sheet (1868–69), Privett (1876–78), Froxfield Green (1886–87) and West Liss (St Mary's; 1892).  Ewan Christian designed Langrish in 1869 and restored Binsted (1863–64), St Peter's at West Liss (1864), St Lawrence's at Alton (1867–68), East Meon (1869–70) and Holybourne (1879).  Henry Woodyer designed Lasham in 1866–68, restored Bentley (1889–90) and assisted with the restoration and enlargement of Farringdon from 1858.  Richard Carpenter and Benjamin Ingelow worked at Bentworth, as did Aston Webb 40 years later.  Alfred Waterhouse's church at Blackmoor was the centrepiece of his "model Victorian country estate" commissioned by the Earl of Selborne in the 1860s.  George Gilbert Scott Jr. reworked Hartley Mauditt in 1868–70, while at Hawkley Samuel Sanders Teulon undertook a complete rebuild, in Neo-Norman fashion, of the medieval church between 1864 and 1865.  The construction of new churches to provide more accommodation in growing towns was not really a feature in such a rural district: only All Saints at Alton (1873–74) was built for this reason.  More common was the opening of chapels of ease in large rural parishes, as at Langrish (East Meon) and Oakhanger (Blackmoor); or the replacement of remote churches with new buildings nearer the 19th-century centre of population, as at Blendworth and Kingsley.  A much later example of this happened at Liphook, formerly in the parish of Bramshott: a chapel of ease opened in 1920 and was superseded by the present church centre in 1970.  Another rapidly growing village, the early 20th-century settlement of Four Marks, had to wait until 1954 to be provided with an Anglican church.

Roman Catholic missions were established in several places independently in the late 19th century.  At Woolmer, near Liphook, a public oratory established in a house in 1870 was the forerunner of the Church of the Immaculate Conception (1911) in Liphook itself.   Similarly, at Grayshott a chapel opened in a house in 1893 and was replaced by a permanent church, St Joseph's, in 1911.  The owner of Ditcham Park in Buriton paid for the construction of St Laurence's Church in Petersfield in 1890.  In the 1960s this church founded two chapels of ease in outlying villages: St Agnes' at Hill Brow, near Liss (still in use) and the Church of the Assumption at East Meon (closed in the 1990s).  Grayshott also had a chapel of ease: Christ the King at Headley, opened in 1965 to replace a former World War II army hut but closed in 1994 and demolished.  Bordon's first Catholic church was also an ex-army hut, this time from World War I, and was used by army personnel and local Catholics; its permanent replacement was built in 1986. Alton's first Catholic church did not open until 1911: it still stands, albeit in residential use, but was only used until 1938 when a new building replaced it.  This was in turn replaced by the present St Mary's Church in 1966.  In the south of the district, Horndean has been served since 1958 by St Edmund's Church—originally a chapel of ease in the large parish of Waterlooville.

Congregationalism was strong locally from the early 19th century.  An Independent chapel was in use in Petersfield by 1801, and its successor Petersfield United Reformed Church (1882) is still in use.  Until the 1960s it maintained an out-station in the hamlet of Ramsdean: this chapel, built in 1830 and enlarged in 1887, is now a house.  Other small rural Congregational chapels survive in alternative use at Oakhanger (opened 1820), Selborne (1860) and Kingsley ( 1882), but the chapel built in 1881 at Rowland's Castle remains in use by the United Reformed Church.  The large chapel at Alton, built in 1834–35 for a congregation with 18th-century roots, survived until 1996 but is now in secular use.  Other United Reformed churches have closed since then: at Finchdean, Medstead (both 2019) and Lovedean (2016).  Lovedean had its origins in outreach from a Presbyterian church at Portsmouth, and the United Reformed church at Hill Brow (still open) also has Presbyterian roots.  There was a Presbyterian chapel at Holybourne, now used by Jehovah's Witnesses, from 1893 until 1972.  The shared church of St Mark at Bordon is used by United Reformed, Methodist and Anglican worshippers.  The International Presbyterian Church, a new denomination established in the United Kingdom in 1969, has used a former Anglican church in Liss since 2010.

The Methodist Church of Great Britain documented all the chapels it owned as of 1940 in a statistical return published in 1947.  Within the boundaries of the present district of East Hampshire at that time, there were 21 chapels representing the denomination's three historic strands: Wesleyanism, Primitive Methodism and the United Methodist Church.  There were chapels of Wesleyan origin at Alton, Binstead, Grayshott, Greatham, Holybourne, Liss, Lower Froyle and Petersfield; Primitive Methodist churches at Bowyers, Buriton, Charlwood, East Meon, Petersfield, Ropley, Stroud and Upper Wield; and United Methodist chapels at Batts Corner, Blacknest, Lindford, Liphook and Standford Hill.  Many of these have been demolished and others secularised or taken over by other religious congregations.  In Petersfield only the former Wesleyan chapel remains in use: the nearby Primitive Methodist church building closed by 1944 and is now a Masonic hall.  The church in Alton dates from 1979–80: it replaced the original chapel of 1846, which was demolished.  The Wesleyan chapels at Holybourne and Liss are now houses, although Liss had been converted into a Kingdom Hall for Jehovah's Witnesses in 1970 after it closed for Methodist worship.  The former Primitive Methodist chapel at Buriton is now an office, while those at East Meon, Stroud and Upper Wield are all residential.  The former United Methodist chapel at Batts Corner is also now a house; Standford Hill has been acquired by the Plymouth Brethren Christian Church and reregistered for their use; but Lindford and Liphook are both still in Methodist occupation.

The only Baptist churches in the district are at Alton (built in 1891 for a congregation established in the mid-19th century) and Horndean.  The Salvation Army have postwar halls in Alton and Petersfield, although both replaced older buildings.  Much older is the Quaker meeting house in Alton, in continuous use since 1672 and considered to be of "exceptional historical value".  Evangelical and non-denominational chapels were founded in the 20th century in Lovedean, Headley Down, Liss, Clanfield, and Alton; and for Open Brethren, Gospel halls built in the 1980s have replaced older facilities in Four Marks and Standford.  The separate Plymouth Brethren Christian Church have a regional meeting room at Horndean with an outlying local room at Clanfield and others outside the district, and there are two others at Liphook and Standford.  At Liss is the headquarters and temple of theosophical group The White Eagle Lodge.

Religious affiliation
According to the 2011 United Kingdom census, 115,608 lived in the district of East Hampshire.  Of these, 64.65% identified themselves as Christian, 0.36% were Muslim, 0.34% were Buddhist, 0.24% were Hindu, 0.14% were Jewish, 0.04% were Sikh, 0.44% followed another religion, 26.28% claimed no religious affiliation and 7.5% did not state their religion.  The proportions of Christians and people who followed no religion were higher than the figures in England as a whole (59.38% and 24.74% respectively).  Islam, Judaism, Hinduism, Sikhism and Buddhism had a lower following in the district than in the country overall: in 2011, 5.02% of people in England were Muslim, 1.52% were Hindu, 0.79% were Sikh, 0.49% were Jewish and 0.45% were Buddhist.

Administration

Anglican churches

East Hampshire lies across the boundaries of three Anglican dioceses: Winchester, which is based at Winchester Cathedral, Portsmouth, whose seat is Portsmouth Cathedral, and Guildford, based at Guildford Cathedral.  Within Portsmouth diocese, the churches at Blendworth, Catherington, Chalton, Clanfield, Idsworth and Rowlands Castle are administered by the Havant Deanery; and Petersfield Deanery is responsible for the churches at Blackmoor, Bramshott (including St Mary's Church Centre in Liphook), Buriton, East Meon, Empshott, Froxfield, Greatham, Hawkley, High Cross, Langrish, Liss, Petersfield, Priors Dean, Sheet, Steep, and Stroud.  The Farnham Deanery of Guildford Diocese looks after the churches at Bordon, Grayshott, Headley and Rowledge.  In the Diocese of Winchester, Alresford Deanery administers the churches at Ropley (including the former Monkwood mission church), Upper Wield and West Tisted; and the churches at Alton (All Saints and St Lawrence), Beech, Bentley, Bentworth, Binsted, Chawton, East Tisted, East Worldham, Farringdon, Four Marks, Hartley Mauditt, Holybourne, Kingsley, Lasham, Medstead, Newton Valence, Oakhanger, Selborne, Shalden, Upper Froyle and West Worldham are in Alton Deanery.

Roman Catholic churches
The Catholic churches in Alton, Bordon, Grayshott, Horndean, Liphook, Liss and Petersfield are part of the Roman Catholic Diocese of Portsmouth, whose seat is the Cathedral of St John the Evangelist in Portsmouth.  The Bordon–Petersfield Pastoral Area of Deanery 4 in the Diocese covers the parishes of Bordon (Sacred Heart Church), Grayshott (St Joseph's Church), Liphook (Church of the Immaculate Conception) and Petersfield (consisting of St Agnes' Church at Liss and St Laurence's Church in Petersfield).   Also in Deanery 4, the Hampshire Downs Pastoral Area includes the parish of Alton (St Mary's Church).  The parish covered by St Edmund's Church at Horndean is in the Havant Pastoral Area of Deanery 5.

Other denominations
The district's five Methodist churches—at Bordon, Horndean, Lindford, Liphook and Petersfield—are part of the 21-church East Solent and Downs Methodist Circuit.  St Francis' Community Church at Headley Down, an interdenominational church, is included in this total as it has "strong ties" with the circuit despite not being formally part of it.  Alton and Horndean Baptist Churches belong to the Southern Counties Baptist Association.  Liss Evangelical Church and the International Presbyterian Church at West Liss belong to Affinity (formerly the British Evangelical Council), a network of conservative Evangelical congregations throughout Great Britain.  Liss Evangelical Church is also affiliated with the Fellowship of Independent Evangelical Churches (FIEC), a pastoral and administrative network of about 500 churches with an evangelical outlook.

Listed status

Eight churches in the district are Grade I-listed, 22 (including three former churches) are listed at Grade II* and 26 (including five former churches) have Grade II listed status.  As of February 2001, there were 1,297 listed buildings in the district of East Hampshire: 14 with Grade I status, 64 listed at Grade II* and 1,219 with Grade II status.

Current places of worship

Former places of worship

Notes

References

Bibliography

 (Available online in 14 parts; Guide to abbreviations on page 6)

East Hampshire
East Hampshire
East Hampshire
East Hampshire, Places of worship
Places of worship